Richey Creek is a stream in the U.S. state of Iowa.

Richey Creek was named after N. B. Richey, a pioneer settler.

References

Rivers of Johnson County, Iowa
Rivers of Louisa County, Iowa
Rivers of Iowa